Michaela Gerg-Leitner (born November 10, 1965 in Lenggries) is a retired German alpine skier.

World Cup victories

References

External links

 
 

1965 births
Living people
German female alpine skiers
Alpine skiers at the 1984 Winter Olympics
Alpine skiers at the 1988 Winter Olympics
Alpine skiers at the 1992 Winter Olympics
Alpine skiers at the 1994 Winter Olympics
Olympic alpine skiers of West Germany
Olympic alpine skiers of Germany
People from Bad Tölz-Wolfratshausen
Sportspeople from Upper Bavaria
20th-century German women